Michel Goldman (born 1 January 1955) is a Belgian medical doctor who specialized in internal medicine and immunology.

Biography 
Michel Goldman graduated as a medical doctor (1978) from Université Libre de Bruxelles (ULB), Belgium, and received his PhD in medical sciences (1981) from Université de Genève, Switzerland. He is board certified in internal medicine (1984) and clinical biology (1993).

From 1990 to 2008, he heads the Department of Immunology-Hematology-Transfusion at Erasme Hospital in Brussels, and from 2004 to 2009 serves as the first Director of the Institute for Medical Immunology built on the Charleroi campus of ULB, with the support of GSKBiologicals and the Walloon Region.

In 2009, Michel Goldman becomes the first executive director of the Innovative Medicines Initiative (IMI)  a joint undertaking between the European Commission and the European Federation of Pharmaceutical Industries and Associations. Managing a budget of €2 billion, he has been responsible for the launch of 59 public-private consortia in areas of major importance, including antimicrobial resistance, Alzheimer's dementia, cancer, diabetes, immuno-inflammatory disorders, autism, chronic pulmonary diseases and drug safety.

Michel Goldman is Professor Emeritus in Immunology at ULB. He is a member of the Board of the Tuberculosis Vaccine Initiative, and of the Board of the Friends of the Global Fund Europe.

Starting from September 2015, Michel Goldman is leading the Institute for Interdisciplinary Innovation in Healthcare (I3h), a ULB centre that has the mission of fostering research, education and outreach networks for the benefit of patients and other stakeholders.

In January 2016 Michel Goldman has been appointed as the Field Chief Editor of Frontiers in Medicine.

Awards and recognition 

1992: Medical Prize Lucien Steinberg (shared with Pr. Peter Piot)
1999: Francqui Chair at the University of Namur
2000: Quinquiennal Prize of the Belgian National Fund for Scientific Research for Clinical Sciences
2001: Spinoza Chair at the University of Amsterdam
2003: Francqui Chair at the University of Liège
2006: Highly Cited Scientist recognition by the Thomson Institute for Scientific Information
2007: Doctor Honoris Causa degree of the University of Lille 2

Selected publications

Biomedical Research

Research and innovation policy

References

Université libre de Bruxelles alumni
1955 births
Living people
Belgian immunologists